The Teşvikiye Mosque is a neo-baroque structure located in the Teşvikiye neighbourhood of Şişli district in Istanbul, Turkey.

History
The mosque was originally commissioned in 1794 by Sultan Selim III, but most of the current mosque that stands today was completed in 1854 during the reign of Sultan Abdülmecit I. It was designed by Krikor Balyan, of the famed family of Armenian architects. It was constructed during a time when several well-known structures in Istanbul were being built or renovated, including the Ortaköy Mosque and Dolmabahçe Palace, in styles imported from Europe. Its front facade, constructed during a renovation in the late 19th century, gives it a unique appearance, with huge white columns. It has become a sort of stand-out symbol in the upscale, bustling quarter of Nişantaşı. It is also often used as the starting point of funerals for famous and public figures.

Orhan Pamuk's childhood
When he was a child, Orhan Pamuk was taken here by his family's housekeeper.

Gallery

References

External links 

 

Religious buildings and structures completed in 1854
Ottoman mosques in Istanbul
Şişli
1794 establishments in the Ottoman Empire
Mosque buildings with domes
Baroque Revival architecture in Turkey